Kakan Rural District is a rural district (dehestan) in the Central District of Boyer-Ahmad County, Kohgiluyeh and Boyer-Ahmad Province, Iran. At the 2006 census, its population was 2,281, in 497 families. The rural district has 16 villages.

History
The district was buried, leaving no survivors, during the 1972 Iran blizzard.

References 

Rural Districts of Kohgiluyeh and Boyer-Ahmad Province
Boyer-Ahmad County